Derek Watt Adams (born 25 June 1975) is a Scottish football manager and former player who is currently manager of Morecambe. Adams played professionally for six clubs, including Aberdeen and Motherwell, where he made over 300 league appearances during his playing career and has managed over 635 games thus far gaining 4 promotions. 

Adams became manager of Ross County in 2007, winning promotion from the Scottish Second Division in his first season, before in reaching the Scottish Cup Final two years later. He joined Hibernian as assistant manager in 2010 before returning to Ross County the following year, where he won the Scottish First Division and was voted PFA Scotland Manager of the Year for the 2011–12 season. Having left Plymouth in April 2019, he became manager of Morecambe in November. He would guide the club to promotion to League One in 2021, before leaving to take over at Bradford; after spending most of the 2021–22 season in charge at Bradford, he would return to Morecambe once again.

Playing career
Adams started his professional career with Aberdeen, but failed to make a first-team appearance. He moved to English side Burnley, making a couple of league appearances in the mid-1990s before returning to Scotland with Ross County in 1996.

Adams was transferred to Motherwell in a deal worth £200,000 in 1998 and spent six years at Fir Park, including a short loan spell with Ayr United. Adams was one of a number of players affected by the club's administration problems, accepting a pay cut in April 2002. Adams failed to win any trophies during his time with Well, although he scored in the 2002–03 Scottish Cup semi-final defeat against Rangers. In 2004, Adams agreed a pre-contract move to his home town club Aberdeen, spending a year at Pittodrie before being transfer-listed and leaving for Livingston in 2005.

Coaching career

Ross County (first spell)
In 2006, Adams returned to Ross County as player–coach. In November 2007, Adams was promoted to the role of player–manager, having served as caretaker manager since October. Despite the terms of Adams' appointment, his last playing appearance was in October 2007. He led Ross County to the Scottish Second Division championship in 2008, earning promotion to the First Division. At the age of 33, Adams became the holder of the UEFA Pro Licence, which is the highest coaching badge in the senior game. The next year, Adams led Ross County to the 2010 Scottish Cup Final, notching upset victories over SPL sides Hibernian and Celtic. County lost 3–0 to Dundee United in the Final.

Hibernian assistant
Adams left Ross County on 11 November 2010 to join Hibernian as assistant manager to Colin Calderwood. Adams has had several disciplinary cases considered by the Scottish Football Association during his coaching career. At one point he was due to be banned for a number of matches, but he won an appeal against part of the suspension. Adams was then suspended for further matches, a sanction which Hibs appealed against. While this appeal was ongoing, Adams described the whole disciplinary process as distressing.

Ross County (second spell)
Adams left Hibernian on 19 May 2011 to return to Ross County as manager. In his first season back at County, Adams guided the club to the 2011–12 Scottish First Division championship and promotion to the Scottish Premier League. County clinched the championship with five games to spare. They went on a remarkable 34 game unbeaten run and finished 24 points above 2nd placed Dundee. Adams was elected PFA Scotland Manager of the Year for the 2011–12 season.

Before the 2012–13 season, Adams made seven signings, all of which were free agents. After three draw and one win, Adams was named SPL manager of the month for August. The club's 40-match unbeaten league was ended by a 2–1 defeat to St Johnstone; Adams said he was very proud of achieving such a long run without defeat. In November 2012, Adams appointed Neale Cooper, who had just left Hartlepool United, as his assistant manager. Ross County struggled during the autumn of 2012, but Adams expected the club to avoid relegation. In late-December the club began a winning streak, that eventually led to a top-six finish in 5th position and 1 point off a European position in their first season in the top flight. In the January 2013 transfer window, Adams offloaded nine players and made six new signings. The winning streak continued, which resulted Adams receiving manager of the month awards for January and February. During the season, Adams was linked with positions at Dundee United and Aberdeen. Adams was nominated for PFA Scotland Manager of the Year, but lost out to Allan Johnston. At the end of the 2012–13 season, Adams signed a new contract with the club.

Ross County finished 7th under Adams at the end of the 2013–14 Scottish Premiership season, the second season in a row finishing above Hibernian, Hearts, Kilmarnock, Partick Thistle and St Mirren. Following a 2-1 Scottish League Cup win over Stranraer, Adams left Ross County on 28 August 2014.

Plymouth Argyle
Adams was appointed Plymouth Argyle manager on 11 June 2015. In his first season in English football as a Manager he guided Plymouth Argyle FC to the League 2 Play Off Final at Wembley for the first time in 20 years, which they lost to AFC Wimbledon. In the following season, Adams guided them to a 2nd-place finish and promotion to League One.

In the 2017–18 season, Plymouth just missed out on a promotion play-off place as they finished in 7th position in League One. Following a poor second season in League One, which left Argyle fighting relegation, Adams was relieved of his duties on 28 April 2019.

Morecambe (first spell)
On 7 November 2019, Adams became manager of Morecambe, replacing the long-serving Jim Bentley, who left to take over at AFC Fylde earlier in the month. Having been denied promotion on the final day of the 2020–21 season by a single point, Morecambe had to settle for the play-offs. They faced Tranmere Rovers in the semi-finals, winning 3–2 on aggregate, a 2–1 win away from home and drawing 1–1 at home. On 31 May 2021, Adams led Morecambe to promotion to the third tier for the first time in their club's history, a penalty from Carlos Mendes Gomes in extra-time securing a 1–0 victory over Newport County. Three days after Morecambe's play-off victory, on 3 June 2021, Adams left the club to pursue other opportunities.

Bradford City
On 4 June 2021, Adams was confirmed manager of Bradford City, signing a three-year deal. 

On 15 February 2022, Adams was sacked by the club with his last match in charge being a 1–0 home defeat to Exeter City that left his side in 12th position, eight points off the play-offs. Following this defeat, Adams said in his post-match interview, “If [Bradford] are going to get a new manager in they’re not going to get as successful a manager as myself in the door. That’s obvious to everyone, because my record is up there with all the records in this league.” They subsequently replaced him with Mark Hughes.

Morecambe (second spell)
On 24 February 2022, Adams returned to Morecambe after Stephen Robinson, the manager who had replaced Adams in the summer, returned to Scotland to manage St Mirren.

Managerial statistics

Honours

Player
Ross County
Scottish Challenge Cup: 2006–07

Manager
Ross County
Scottish First Division: 2011–12
Scottish Second Division: 2007–08
Scottish Cup runner-up: 2009–10

Plymouth Argyle
League Two runner-up: 2016–17

Morecambe
League Two play-offs: 2020–21

Individual
PFA Scotland Manager of the Year: 2011–12
League One Manager of the Month: February 2018
League Two Manager of the Month: October 2015, September 2016, December 2020

References

External links 

1975 births
Living people
Footballers from Aberdeen
Scottish footballers
Association football midfielders
Aberdeen F.C. players
Burnley F.C. players
Ross County F.C. players
Motherwell F.C. players
Ayr United F.C. players
Livingston F.C. players
Scottish Football League players
English Football League players
Scottish Premier League players
Scottish football managers
Ross County F.C. managers
Hibernian F.C. non-playing staff
Plymouth Argyle F.C. managers
Morecambe F.C. managers
Bradford City A.F.C. managers
Scottish Football League managers
Scottish Premier League managers
Scottish Professional Football League managers
English Football League managers